László Bénes (born 9 September 1997) is a Slovak professional footballer who plays as a midfielder for 2. Bundesliga club Hamburger SV and the Slovakia national team.

Early life
Bénes was born in Dunajská Streda (a predominantly ethnic Hungarian town) to an ethnic Hungarian family.

Club career
On 6 February 2015, Bénes signed a three-year deal with Fortuna Liga side MŠK Žilina from Győr.

On 1 July 2016, he joined Bundesliga club Borussia Mönchengladbach.

On 28 January 2019, Bénes moved to 2. Bundesliga side Holstein Kiel for the second half of the season. He debuted in his first opportunity, in an away 2. Bundesliga fixture against Heidenheim, only two days after joining the club, on 30 January 2019. He played over 22 minutes, substituting Jonas Meffert in the 68th minute of the match, which concluded in a 2–2 tie. Bénes was booked with a yellow card in the 79th minute.

In his second cap for Kiel, on 3 February, against Jahn Regensburg (2–0 victory), Bénes received the highest rating from Kiel, 7.9/10 (along with Kenneth Kronholm, Jannik Dehm, Kingsley Schindler), according to the Sofascore portal.

On 1 February 2021, Bénes moved to Bundesliga club FC Augsburg, on a loan deal until the end of the season.

On 21 June 2022, Bénes signed a four-year contract with Hamburger SV.

International career
Bénes was first called up to Slovak senior national team in May 2017, when Ján Kozák called him up for a FIFA World Cup qualifier against Lithuania on 10 June 2017, just a number of days before the commencement before the 2017 UEFA European Under-21 Championship, where Bénes was expected to be one of the team leaders. During this match Bénes made his international debut, when he substituted Ondrej Duda in the 89th minute of the 2–1 victory in Vilnius. Due to number of prolonged injuries and low play time in at Mönchengladbach, Bénes made no further appearances in the national team under Kozák, who resigned in October 2018.

However, after an increased play time on loan in Kiel, Bénes made a return to the national team. On 28 May 2019, when coach Pavel Hapal called him up for a double fixture in June - a home friendly against Jordan, to which, unusually, 29 players were called-up and a UEFA Euro 2020 qualifying fixture against Azerbaijan, played away on 11 June 2019. The squad was to be reduced to 23 players for the latter fixture. Hapal was the coach who brought Bénes into public eye in Slovakia, during the successful 2017 UEFA U-21 Euro campaign. Subsequently, the core of the U21 squad became known as Hapal's children, including Bénes.

Career statistics

Club

International goals
As of match played 23 June 2021. Scores and results list Slovakia's goal tally first, score column indicates score after each Bénes goal.

References

External links
 
 
 
 Bénes László at  
 Bénes László at  

1997 births
Living people
Sportspeople from Dunajská Streda
Hungarians in Slovakia
Slovak footballers
Slovakia international footballers
Association football midfielders
Győri ETO FC players
Nemzeti Bajnokság I players
MŠK Žilina players
Borussia Mönchengladbach players
Borussia Mönchengladbach II players
Holstein Kiel players
FC Augsburg players
Hamburger SV players
Slovak Super Liga players
Bundesliga players
2. Bundesliga players
Regionalliga players
UEFA Euro 2020 players
Slovak expatriate footballers
Slovak expatriate sportspeople in Hungary
Expatriate footballers in Hungary
Slovak expatriate sportspeople in Germany
Expatriate footballers in Germany